George Washington House may refer to:

George Washington House (Bladensburg, Maryland), in Prince George's County
George Washington Boyhood Home Site, Fredericksburg, Virginia
George Washington House (Barbados), a house where young George Washington and his brother stayed for a time.
Mount Vernon, Washington's Virginia estate

See also
Washington House (disambiguation)